The 2016 Ole Miss Rebels baseball team represented the University of Mississippi in the 2016 NCAA Division I baseball season. The Rebels played their home games at Swayze Field.

Previous season
In 2015, the Rebels finished 30–28 overall and 15–14 in conference play. Despite entering the postseason with high hopes, the Rebels lost their only game of the SEC Tournament and lost two straight in the Los Angeles Regional of the 2015 NCAA Division I baseball tournament to finish the season.

2015 MLB Draft Selections
Four Rebels were selected in the 2015 MLB draft, along with two incoming players who chose to join the team.

Players in bold returned to Ole Miss.
†Chad Smith and Andy Pagnozzi were drafted out of community college and high school, respectively, but decided to attend Ole Miss.

Preseason

Preseason All-American teams
1st Team
Errol Robinson - Shortstop (D1Baseball)
Errol Robinson - Shortstop (Baseball America)

SEC Media poll
The pre-season SEC media poll of February 19, 2016 saw Ole Miss predicted to finish in fifth place in the Western Division.

Preseason All-SEC teams
2nd Team
Errol Robinson - Shortstop

Roster

Schedule and results

*Rankings are based on the team's current ranking in the Coaches Poll.

Oxford Regional

Awards and honors

Award watch lists

Regular season awards

All-SEC Awards

All-American Awards

Record vs. conference opponents

2016 MLB Draft

Rankings

References

Ole Miss Rebels
Ole Miss Rebels baseball seasons
2016 in sports in Mississippi
Ole Miss